Wanam may refer to:
 Wanám people, a historic ethnic group of Brazil
 Wañam language, an extinct language of Brazil
 village dialects of several unrelated languages of New Guinea:
 Kosarek language, of Yahukimo Regency, Papua, Indonesia
 Tami language, of Morobe Province, Papua New Guinea
 Wanam, a village in Merauke Regency, Papua, Indonesia, where the Yelmek language is spoken

See also 
 

Language and nationality disambiguation pages